Valletti is an Italian surname. Notable people with the surname include:

Aldo Valletti (1930–1992), Italian film actor
Cesare Valletti (1922–2000), Italian operatic tenor
Tommaso Valletti, Italian economist

See also
Valetti

Italian-language surnames